The Edinburgh–Dunblane line is a railway line in East Central Scotland. It links the city of Edinburgh via Falkirk to the city of Stirling and the town of Dunblane.

Service provision

Connections to other services
This line connects into other services in several locations:
 – Highland Main Line
 – Croy Line
 – Croy Line
 – Cumbernauld Line
 – Glasgow–Edinburgh via Falkirk line
 – North Clyde Line
 – Fife Circle Line, Edinburgh to Aberdeen Line, Shotts Line, West Coast Main Line
 – Borders Railway, North Berwick Line, East Coast Main Line

Scotrail service from 2004 to 2018
The services on this line were run by First ScotRail until 2015, then by Abellio ScotRail. The vast majority of services were worked by Class 158 and Class 170 DMUs, with some services being provided by Class 156s. Until the opening of the Borders Railway in 2015, the line joined the Edinburgh Crossrail at Edinburgh Park.

ScotRail service from 2018
Following completion of electrification of the line between Polmont Junction through Stirling and to Dunblane, Abellio Scotrail commenced electrified passenger services with the timetable change of 9 December 2018. The service continued to make use of some diesel traction, with Class 365 units providing electric services until March 2019, after which all services were taken over by Class 385s. The timetable change also saw the Polmont and Linlithgow stops removed from the Monday-Saturday daytime stopping pattern, being replaced by the new Edinburgh-Glasgow service running via the Cumbernauld Line.

In April 2022, Scottish Government-owned ScotRail took over the operation of the line from Abellio ScotRail.

History
The route built in several stages:
 Edinburgh and Glasgow Railway between Edinburgh Waverley railway station and Haymarket in 1846.
 Edinburgh and Glasgow Railway between Haymarket and Polmont on 21 February 1842.
 Stirlingshire Midland Junction Railway between Polmont and Carmuirs / Larbert Junctions in 1850
 Scottish Central Railway between Carmuirs / Larbert Junctions and Dunblane in 1847

Electrification
The line was electrified as part of the rolling programme of electrification in Scotland's Central Belt in 2018.

Sources

References

External links
 Scottish Strategic Rail Study showing a Croy line map

Transport in Edinburgh
Transport in Falkirk (council area)
Transport in Stirling (council area)
Railway lines in Scotland
Standard gauge railways in Scotland